This is a season-by-season list of records compiled by Quinnipiac in men's ice hockey.

Despite being a Division II school the ice hockey team played as a Division III program until 1998 when the University raised all of its programs to the Division I level.

Quinnipiac University has made several appearances in the NCAA Tournament, reaching the championship game in 2013 and 2016.

Season-by-season results

Note: GP = Games played, W = Wins, L = Losses, T = Ties

* Winning percentage is used when conference schedules are unbalanced.† Quinnipiac was ruled ineligible for postseason play and their divisional games were not counted in conference standings as a result of the program offering athletic scholarships.

Footnotes

References

 
Lists of college men's ice hockey seasons in the United States
Quinnipiac Bobcats ice hockey seasons